Dolores County is a county located in the U.S. state of Colorado. As of the 2020 census, the population was 2,326. The county seat is Dove Creek.

History
It is thought that the area has been the site of human habitation since at least 2500 B.C. Dolores County's western portions were densely populated between 900 and 1300 AD. Population estimates of as many as 10,000 inhabitants, with villages containing hundreds of rooms, have been discovered by archaeologists and other researchers.  But this population was destroyed or migrated elsewhere, apparently following a drought and severe societal upheaval in the 14th century, and for centuries thereafter, both the western and eastern mountainous areas of the county were occupied mostly by nomads, including the Ute and the Navajo Indians. Like much of southwestern Colorado, Dolores County is rich in Indian ruins and sites of the Anasazi. According to the Anasazi Heritage Center, Dolores County contains at least 816 recorded archaeological sites as of 1989, with many more inventoried since that time.

The county also contains a portion of a site of regional historic interest, the Dominguez-Escalante Trail of 1776. The trail marks a historic  trip, intended to discover an overland route between Santa Fe, New Mexico and Monterey, California.  The Expedition camped on Dove Creek in the western portion of the county. The Old Spanish Trail later passed through the western portion of the county.

Anglo trappers worked the mountains of eastern Dolores County as early as 1832–33, and gold was discovered in the County in 1866.  But it was not until the area was taken from the Ute and removed from the Ute Reservation by the Brunot Agreement of 1878 that large-scale minerals exploration and mining began in the county, although the Pioneer Mining District was established in 1876 in the Rico area.  The development of the area was spurred by the discovery of large silver deposits near Rico in 1879, and the Rio Grande Southern Railroad was constructed through the county to connect Durango, Telluride, and Ridgway in 1890-92 The RGS served the eastern end of Dolores County until 1952 when it was abandoned.  (The western portion of the county has never had railroad service.)

Rico's high point was in 1892, when the mining district population was more than 5,000; three times the current population of the entire county. The 1893 Silver Panic hit the town hard; by 1900 the population was 811.  The mountainous area of Dolores County went through a series of booms and busts through the 20th Century.  The low point of the community came in 1974 with an estimated population of 45; since then the town has become a bedroom community for Telluride and has limited tourism and subdivisions; the population has rebounded to almost 300.  Efforts are underway in the early 21st Century to again begin major mining activities in the region.

Dove Creek was a way station on the Old Spanish Trail from the mid 19th century, for caravans and travelers moving between Santa Fe, Salt Lake City, and northern California and Nevada. The western portion of the county was used, beginning in the 1870s, for cattle ranching, but the lush grass soon suffered from overgrazing and then fire suppression, allowing the massive expansion of sagebrush, pinyon, and juniper.  Homesteading in the area became common beginning in 1914, and dryland farming expanded throughout the Great Sage Plain. Today dryland farming of pinto beans and winter wheat is still a mainstay of the county's economy. But the development of irrigation using water from the Dolores Project in the 1980s, with the construction of McPhee Reservoir (immediately upstream in Montezuma County), has changed the history and population of the county.

Dolores County was created by the Colorado legislature on February 19, 1881, from the western portions of Ouray County, and was named for the Dolores River, which heads up in the county and passes through the county in the Dolores Canyon. The complete Spanish name was Rio de Nuestra Señora de los Dolores (River of our Lady of Sorrows), as reported by Father Silvestre Vélez de Escalante in 1776.  Originally set in Rico, the first county courthouse was a 23x48 foot two storage log cabin, but was replaced by a stone and brick courthouse completed in 1883.  the county seat was moved to Dove Creek in 1946, and the current courthouse built in 1957. (The original county courthouse in Rico is now the town hall and a branch of the public library.)

In 2009, Dolores County achieved notoriety as the most economically depressed county in Colorado.

Geography

Dolores County, like other counties in Colorado along its border with Utah, is split into two geographically distinct regions, and in fact, under normal travel conditions, it is necessary to leave the county to travel between the two regions. The western portion of the county (east of the Dolores River Canyon and along the Utah border) is the northern portion of the Great Sage Plain, relatively low (6500–7500 feet in elevation) and flat (but cut by large canyons, including that of the Dolores River itself), and consists of irrigated and dryland farming areas; it is especially well known for the cultivation of various varieties of beans, including pinto beans and many variety of old Anasazi beans. The central portion of the county has higher open grasslands with forested hills, ravines, and canyons, used for livestock raising.  The eastern portion of the county is located in the highest peaks of the San Juan Mountains, around the old mining and modern tourist town of Rico, and except for cattle grazing in the San Juan National Forest, has virtually no agriculture, in part because its elevations range from 9,000 to 14,000+. Rico is developing in many ways as a bedroom community for the much wealthier town of Telluride in San Miguel County to the north.

Only 38% of the county is private land, located mostly in two large areas at the extreme western end of the county (dryland and irrigated cropland and towns along US 491) and in the central portion of the county (grazing land), with a few thousand acres in scattered parcels (mostly patented mining claims) in the eastern portion of the county around Rico.  Separating this private land, 50% of the county is owned by the US Government and administered by the US Forest Service as part of San Juan National Forest.  An additional 10% of the county is US government land administered by the Bureau of Land Management, including portions of Canyon of the Ancients National Monument.  The State of Colorado owns 2% of the county, primarily used as wildlife areas.

Adjacent counties

 San Miguel County, Colorado - north
 San Juan County, Colorado - east
 Montezuma County, Colorado - south
 La Plata County, Colorado - southeast
 San Juan County, Utah - west

Major Highways
  U.S. Highway 491
  State Highway 141
  State Highway 145

Demographics

As of the census of 2000, there were 1,844 people, 785 households, and 541 families residing in the county.  The population density was 2 people per square mile (1/km2). There were 1,193 housing units at an average density of one per square mile (0/km2).  The racial makeup of the county was 95.28% White, 0.05% Black or African American, 1.95% Native American, 0.38% Asian, 0.05% Pacific Islander, 0.60% from other races, and 1.68% from two or more races. 3.85% of the population were Hispanic or Latino of any race.

There were 785 households, out of which 24.50% had children under the age of 18 living with them, 57.70% were married couples living together, 8.50% had a female householder with no husband present, and 31.00% were non-families. 26.20% of all households were made up of individuals, and 10.40% had someone living alone who was 65 years of age or older.  The average household size was 2.35 and the average family size was 2.82.

In the county, the population was spread out, with 21.90% under the age of 18, 6.80% from 18 to 24, 26.30% from 25 to 44, 27.80% from 45 to 64, and 17.10% who were 65 years of age or older.  The median age was 42 years. For every 100 females there were 107.20 males.  For every 100 females age 18 and over, there were 104.50 males.

The median income for a household in the county was $32,196, and the median income for a family was $38,000. Males had a median income of $30,972 versus $20,385 for females. The per capita income for the county was $17,106.  About 10.20% of families and 13.10% of the population were below the poverty line, including 9.80% of those under age 18 and 18.30% of those age 65 or over.

In the third quarter of 2009, county unemployment was 13.1%, the worst in Colorado, and up from 7.3% in 2008.  Average weekly wages were $489.  Many residents of the county commute to San Miquel County (Telluride) or Montezuma County (primarily Cortez and rural-area industries and commercial establishments).

Communities

Towns
Dove Creek
Rico

Unincorporated Communities
Cahone

Politics
In its early history Dolores County favored the Democratic Party. It was one of the few western or northern counties to be won by Alton B. Parker in 1904, and was never won by a Republican until Warren G. Harding carried the county in 1920. In the 1924 election Dolores was the only county in Colorado to give a plurality of its vote to “Fighting Bob” La Follette, but since World War II Dolores has gradually become a powerfully Republican county. The last Democrat to win a majority in Dolores County has been Lyndon Johnson in his 1964 landslide, and although Jimmy Carter obtained a plurality in 1976, no subsequent Democratic presidential nominee has obtained 35 percent of the county's vote.

In gubernatorial elections, Dolores County is also Republican-leaning: in 2010 it was along with neighboring Montezuma County one of only two counties to give a plurality to Dan Maes The last Democratic gubernatorial candidate to win Dolores County was Bill Ritter in 2006, whilst Roy Romer carried the county twice in 1986 and 1990.

National protected areas
Calico National Recreation Trail
Canyons of the Ancients National Monument (part)
Lizard Head Wilderness
Old Spanish National Historic Trail
San Juan National Forest

Transportation
Dolores County has no railroads operating today. The western third of the county is served by US 491 (formerly US 666) connecting to Cortez, CO, and Monticello, UT; and SH 141 to Nucla, CO. The eastern portion of the county is served by SH 145 connecting to Dolores, CO, and Telluride, CO.  The central portion of the county is served by the joint County-USFS Norwood Road connecting to Dolores, CO, and Norwood, CO (in San Miquel County).  The three portions of the county are connected directly to each other only by gravel-surface, low-speed county or federal agency roads.

The only airport is the privately owned Dove Creek Airport east of Dove Creek; a general aviation facility with a  runway.  The nearest commercial service is located at Cortez Municipal Airport to the south, and San Juan (UT) County Airport north of Monticello.

Bicycle routes
Great Parks Bicycle Route
Western Express Bicycle Route

Scenic byway
San Juan Skyway National Scenic Byway

See also

Outline of Colorado
Index of Colorado-related articles
Colorado census statistical areas
National Register of Historic Places listings in Dolores County, Colorado

References

External links

Colorado County Evolution by Don Stanwyck
Colorado Historical Society
Dolores County Ministry of Tourism

 

 
Colorado counties
1881 establishments in Colorado
Populated places established in 1881